Daniel Melnick (April 21, 1932 – October 13, 2009) was an American film producer and movie studio executive who started working in Hollywood as a teenager in television and then became the producer of such films as All That Jazz, Altered States and Straw Dogs. Melnick's films won more than 20 Academy Awards out of some 80 nominations.

Early life and education
Melnick was born on April 21, 1932, in New York City, the son of Celia and Benjamin Melnick, Jewish immigrants from Russia. His father was killed in a car crash when Melnick was a child. His mother remarried. Melnick attended the High School of Performing Arts. After high school, Melnick attended New York University. He served in the United States Army during the 1950s, where he produced entertainment for troops while stationed at New Jersey's Fort Dix and in Oklahoma.

Television, film and theater
After relocating to Hollywood as a 19-year-old, he became CBS Television's youngest producer, and then shortly thereafter was hired by ABC, where he worked on the development of such programs as The Flintstones and The Fugitive.

Talent Associates
After a stint in the army, Melnick returned to New York City in the late '50s, becoming a partner in Talent Associates, a production company founded several years earlier by David Susskind and Leonard Stern. Among other productions, TA created the Emmy Award winning secret agent satire Get Smart that ran from 1965 to 1970 on CBS and NBC, as well as the police drama N.Y.P.D. that ran on the American Broadcasting Company (ABC) from 1967 to 1969. Melnick's role in Get Smart was to hire Mel Brooks and Buck Henry to create a half hour sitcom addressing in Melnick's words "the two biggest things in the entertainment world today – James Bond and Inspector Clouseau". ABC paid for a pilot episode, but did not purchase the series, so Melnick turned to Grant Tinker at NBC, who had Don Adams under contract and were looking for a project for the comedian.

Talent Associates produced the Emmy Award-winning TV productions aired on CBS, with Ages of Man  starring John Gielgud in 1966, which included readings from William Shakespeare's works ranging from Romeo and Juliet to Richard II, with critic Jack Gould of The New York Times calling it "a viewing occasion to be treasured". In 1967 they presented Arthur Miller's Death of a Salesman, starring Lee J. Cobb, a production that Jack Gould of The Times described as one "that will stand as the supreme understanding of the tragedy of Willy Loman."<ref>Gould, Jack. "TV: 'Death of a Salesman'; New Interpretation Tops Stage Version-- Miss Dunnock and Cobb Repeat Roles", 'The New York Times, May 9, 1966. Accessed October 18, 2009.</ref> The firm, Talent Associates, was bought out by Norton Simon, Inc. in August 1968 for an undisclosed price, with the commitment that the unit would operate independently and the principals would stay on in senior positions to manage the company.

Together with Joseph E. Levine of Embassy Pictures, Susskind and Melnick produced the Broadway theatre musical comedy Kelly, by Eddie Lawrence and Mark Charlap. Promotion for the play included an event on the Brooklyn Bridge with a series of chorus girls. The play, a story about the 1886 incident of Steve Brodie who (claimed to have) jumped off the Brooklyn Bridge and survived, opened on February 16, 1965. The play lasted only one performance on Broadway, which was later described by Melnick's son as "not his favorite moment in history", but nonetheless one he wore with grace.

The 1971 psychological thriller Straw Dogs was his first feature film.

Head of MGM
He was hired by MGM as head of production in February 1972. It was a time of decline for MGM with the studio pulling back on production but while there his films included the 1975 Neil Simon comedy The Sunshine Boys and the 1976 production of Paddy Chayefsky's screenplay for Network, directed by Sidney Lumet, a satire of television production that was credited with boosting the studio's financial performance. He also mined the studio's archives to create the That's Entertainment! series of compilation films.

Columbia
He was hired by Columbia Pictures as its president in June 1978 to replace David Begelman, who had resigned in the wake of an embezzlement scandal. There he oversaw the development of the 1978 picture Midnight Express and the 1979 films Kramer vs. Kramer and The China Syndrome.

In 1980, he moved to 20th Century Fox where he completed Bob Fosse's All That Jazz, with Fox paying for filming that Columbia would not finance. That same year he produced Altered States with Warner Brothers, an adaptation of a Chayefsky novel that Columbia was unwilling to fund. Shortly after that, he started The IndieProd Company to set up his own projects after his mismanagement at Columbia, that given a right of first refusal to produce projects.

Later years
Melnick's later films included the 1987 Steve Martin comedy Roxanne, an adaption of the classic play Cyrano de Bergerac, Mountains of the Moon in 1990, the 1991 Steve Martin comedy L.A. Story, and the action comedy Blue Streak'' (1999), which was his final film credit. Through The IndieProd Company, Carolco Pictures acquired the company in 1987. In the late 1980s/early 1990s, the company set up a joint partnership with Rastar Productions to start a joint venture Rastar/IndieProd, headed by Nancy Tanen and Tracy Barone, both of them would eventually join Channel Productions briefly in 1993. In 1992, Carolco sold off IndieProd, becoming an independent production company once again, and received a four-year $350 million distribution pact with TriStar Pictures and Japan Satellite Broadcasting in order to invest money into their own films.

Personal life
He married Linda Rodgers, the daughter of Richard Rodgers and Dorothy Feiner Rodgers, in February 1955, at the Manhattan home of her parents. Their son, Peter Rodgers Melnick, became a composer. After he and Linda Rodgers divorced in 1971, Melnick fathered a daughter.

Melnick was known for personal elegance and refined tastes in art, dress, and architecture. A thinker, he often offered sage advice, once telling a young assistant that "the best contracts are written not in the thrall of a new marriage but with the possibility of a divorce in mind."

He once said to the same assistant that, when facing a business dilemma, he would sometimes ask himself what the 17th-century French statesman Cardinal Richelieu, whose genius for intrigue he admired, might do in a similar situation.

During Melnick's days on the 20th Century-Fox lot, some of his staffers would affectionately refer to him (albeit privately) as Mel Nick. The inspiration for the name arose when deliverymen arrived in front of the unmarked Indieprod building with a wardrobe box of clothes from Ralph Lauren – on which someone had scrawled in large letters MEL and below it NICK. Not knowing who he was or where to find him, one shouted, "We're looking for a Mel Nick! There a Mel Nick around here?"

In regard to producing films, Melnick once reminded one of his assistants, who he thought was working too hard, that "this business is supposed to be fun."

His regular poker games would include such Hollywood notables as Johnny Carson, Chevy Chase, Barry Diller, Steve Martin, Carl Reiner and Neil Simon.

Melnick died at the age of 77 on October 13, 2009, at his home in Los Angeles of lung cancer. He was survived by a son, a daughter, and two grandchildren.

Select credits
He was a producer in all films unless otherwise noted.

Film

As Head of MGM

Thanks

Television

Thanks

References

External links

1932 births
2009 deaths
Film producers from California
American people of Russian-Jewish descent
Television producers from California
Deaths from lung cancer in California
Fiorello H. LaGuardia High School alumni
New York University alumni
Businesspeople from Los Angeles
Businesspeople from New York City
United States Army soldiers
American film studio executives
Metro-Goldwyn-Mayer executives
Television producers from New York City
Film producers from New York (state)
20th-century American businesspeople
Presidents of Columbia Pictures